Sahrawi Republic Cup is the top knockout tournament of the Sahrawi Football Federation. It is organised by the Sahrawi Arab Democratic Republic. The tournament was established in 2016 and is held annually in the Algerian city Tindouf, where the exile government of the Polisario Front is based. The participating teams are usually clubs based in the Sahrawi refugee camps.

Winners

By titles

References 

Football in Western Sahara
Sahrawi Arab Democratic Republic
Recurring sporting events established in 2016
2016 establishments in Western Sahara